Suspended Animation Dreams is a psychedelic progressive metal album by the band Subterranean Masquerade. It is the follow-up to their 2004 EP Temporary Psychotic State, and the second part of a trilogy.

Track listing
All songs written by Tomer Pink.
 "Suspended Animation Dreams" - 2:26
 "Wolf Among Sheep" - 6:26
 "No Place Like Home" - 8:00
 "Kind of a Blur" - 3:12
 "The Rock 'n' Roll Preacher" - 9:06
 "Six Strings to Cover Fear" - 6:48
 "Awake" - 14:23
 "X" - 4:28

Personnel
 Paul Kuhr - vocals
 Tomer Pink - guitar
 Jake DePolitte - Guitar, Bass guitar
 Steve Lyman - Drums, percussion
 Ben Warren - Organ, Piano, keyboards

External reviews
[ Suspended Animation Dreams Review @ Allmusic.com]
Suspended Animation Dreams Review @ Aversionline.com
Animation Dreams Review @ Metal Perspective

External links
The End Records Website
Subterranean Masquerade official site
Suspended Animation Dreams @ Encyclopaedia Metallum

2005 debut albums
Subterranean Masquerade albums
The End Records albums